KJME is a radio station airing a classic country/bluegrass format licensed to Fountain, Colorado, broadcasting on 780 kHz AM and 105.1 FM. The station serves the Colorado Springs, Colorado and Pueblo, Colorado areas, and is owned by Timothy C. Cutforth.

References

External links

Classic country radio stations in the United States
JME
Radio stations established in 2011
2011 establishments in Colorado